Lottah is a rural locality in the local government area (LGA) of Break O'Day in the North-east LGA region of Tasmania, Australia. The 2016 census recorded a population of 13 for the state suburb of Lottah.
It is a small town in Northeastern Tasmania. The closest settlement is Pyengana and the closest major town is St Helens.

History 
Lottah was gazetted as a locality in 1969. It was historically known as Blue Tier Junction. A post office of that name was established in 1877 and renamed "Lottah" in 1895, supposedly an Aboriginal word for "gum tree".

Tin was discovered in Lottah in about 1875. The Anchor Mine became operational in 1880, and the town of Lottah grew up around the mine. At its peak, it had several hundred residents, and community facilities included a school, two hotels, two churches, a bakery, and a football club. Lottah supported a small Chinese community, and one of its more notable residents was Senator Thomas Bakhap, who had a Chinese stepfather and worked as an interpreter. People born in Lottah during its heyday include architecture professor Brian Lewis and RAAF officer Alan Charlesworth. The Anchor Mine closed in 1950, at which point the town's population had been in decline for several decades.

Geography
Almost all the boundaries are survey lines.

Road infrastructure
Route A3 (Tasman Highway) passes to the south. From there, several roads provide access to the locality.

References

Further reading
 Richardson, Garry (2016), Lottah and the Anchor: the History of a Tin Mine and a Dependent Town, Forty South Publishing

External links
 Photograph of Lottah, 1914

Ghost towns in Tasmania
Mining towns in Tasmania
North East Tasmania
Populated places established in the 1880s
Localities of Break O'Day Council